Brian Wanek (born May 25, 1967) is an American speed skater. He competed at the 1992 Winter Olympics and the 1994 Winter Olympics.

References

External links
 

1967 births
Living people
American male speed skaters
Olympic speed skaters of the United States
Speed skaters at the 1992 Winter Olympics
Speed skaters at the 1994 Winter Olympics
Speed skaters from Milwaukee